Ravna planina (Serbian Cyrillic: Равна планина) is a mountain in central Serbia, near the town of Vrnjačka Banja. Its highest peak Crni vrh has an elevation of 1,542 meters above sea level.

References

Mountains of Serbia